Zygogramma is a large genus of leaf beetles in the subfamily Chrysomelinae, which includes approximately 100 species. 13 species occur north of Mexico.

Adults and larvae are herbivorous on various host plants. Zygogramma exclamationis is a pest species of sunflower crops in North America. At least two species have also been used as a form of biological pest control: Zygogramma bicolorata was introduced to India as a biocontrol agent for the weed Parthenium hysterophorus, and Zygogramma suturalis was introduced to Russia as a control for Ambrosia artemisiifolia (common ragweed).

Selected species 

Zygogramma arizonica Schaeffer, 1906
Zygogramma bicolorata Pallister, 1953
Zygogramma conjuncta (Rogers, 1856)
Zygogramma continua (J. L. LeConte, 1868)
Zygogramma disrupta (Rogers, 1856)
Zygogramma estriata Schaeffer, 1919
Zygogramma exclamationis (Fabricius, 1798)
Zygogramma heterothecae Linell, 1896
Zygogramma malvae (Stål, 1859)
Zygogramma opifera (Stål, 1860)
Zygogramma piceicollis (Stål, 1859)
Zygogramma signatipennis (Stål, 1859)
Zygogramma suturalis (Fabricius, 1775)
Zygogramma tortuosa (Rogers, 1856)

References

External links
List of publications for Zygogramma at the Biodiversity Heritage Library

Chrysomelinae
Chrysomelidae genera
Taxa named by Louis Alexandre Auguste Chevrolat